The following list of gangs was published in the Glasgow Evening Times in February 2006 as identified by Strathclyde Police with the accompanying map.

The city was divided into North Glasgow, South Glasgow and East Glasgow. East Glasgow had the most identified gangs with 41 followed by South Glasgow with 38 and North Glasgow with 31. The districts with the overall greatest number of gangs were Greater Pollok with 11, Govan with 10 and Drumchapel with 9.

North and west Glasgow
Drumchapel
 Y. Peel Glen Team
 Y. Hill Team Derry
 Y. Linkwood Mad Squad
 Southdeen Young Team
 Young Cloan Mad Squad
 Y. Bellway Fleeto
 Jedworth Young Team
 Y. Dardie P
 Y. Essenside Fleeto

West Clydeside
 Yoker Langy
 Yoker Toi
 Y. Whiteinch Bowrie
 Y. Scotstoun Fleet
 Finnieston
 Anderston Young Team

Knightswood
 Y. Kwood Fleeto

Maryhill
 Y. Trossachs Street
 Valley Young Team
 Y. Maryhill Fleeto
 Y. Queens Cross 
 Y. Georges Cross

Cadder & Summerston
 Cadder Young Team
 Y. Skitzo Lyndale

Milton and Possil
 Westray Boyz
 Backend Boyz
 Y. Milton Tongs
 Y. Ruchill Boyz
 Y. Posso Fleeto
 Keppochhill Gang

West End
 Y. Partick Fleeto
 Hillhead Young Team

Sighthill / Townhead
 Y. Sighthill Mafia
 Young Toon Toi

North East
 Y. Springburn Peg
 Y. Tiny Gringo
 Auchinairn Young Team
 Young Blackhill Toi
 Royston Catholic Shamrock
 Riddrie Loyal
 Young Germiston

South Glasgow

Govan
 Y. Govan Team
 Y. Linthouse Goucho
 Drumoyne Young Team
 Y. Crosse Posse
 Y. Kimbo Kills
 Teucharhill Young Team
 Young Young Winey
 Ibrox Tongs
 Kinning Park Derry
 Craigton Goucho

Gorbals
 Y. Sooside Cumbie
 Y. Crossie Cumbie
 Hutchie Boyz

Greater Pollok
 Y. Pollok Kross
 Y. Crookie Possie
 Pollok Young Team
 Y. Pollok Bushwackers
 Housy Mad Sqwad
 Y. Nitsie Fleeto
 Y. Southie
 Parkhouse
 Y. Tiny Priesty
 Arden Young Toon
 Darnley Mad Squad

South West
 Y. Penilee Pen
 Hillington Young Team
 Mossy Derry
 Mossy Young Team

Southside
 Y. Shaws Team
 Govanhill Young Team
 Young Shields Mad Sqwad
 Toryglen Toi
 Battlefield Young Team

Castlemilk
 Y. Castlemilk Valley
 Y. Castlemilk Tay
 Castlemilk Young Craig
 Y. Holmbyre Fleet
 Carmunnock Young Team

East Glasgow

Inner East End
 Duke Street Fleet
 Haghill Powery
 Real Calton Tongs
 Monks Dennistoun
 Gallowgate Mad Squad

Bridgeton & Dalmarnock
 Y. Bridgeton Derry
 Y. White Scheme Derry
 Reid Street Dickies
 Reid Street Derry
 Baltic Fleet

Parkhead / Shettleston / Tollcross
 Y. Parkhead Border
 Y. Parkhead Rebels
 Y. Shettleston Tigers
 Tollcross Wee Men

East End
 The Fullarton
 Y. Carmyle Tahiti
 The Vulgar
 The Mounty

Easterhouse
 The Drummy
 Young Den-Toi
 Skinheads
 Aggro
 Bal-Toi
 Provvy

Edinburgh Road
 Bar-L
 Young Calvay
 The Boig
 Young Torran Toi
 The Easthall
 Young Carntyne Goucho
 High Tyne
 Young Cranhill Fleeto

Ruchazie / Garthamlock
 Coby
 Young High End Ziggy Fleet
 Lo End
 GYTO
 Craigend

References

Further Information
Glasgow Gangs

See also
Glasgow razor gangs

Glasgow

Gangs
Gangs